Apatelodes paulista is a moth in the family Apatelodidae first described by E. Dukinfield Jones in 1908. It is found in São Paulo, Brazil.

The wingspan is about 47 – 57 mm. The forewings are grey, irrorated (sprinkled) with yellowish-brown, with a light brown wavy antemedial band. The hindwings are yellowish-brown with indistinct medial and postmedial lines.

References

Apatelodidae
Moths described in 1908